The Bréguet Br.1050 Alizé (French: "Tradewind") is a French carrier-based anti-submarine warfare aircraft. It was developed in the 1950s, based loosely on the second prototype Bréguet Vultur attack aircraft which had been modified into the Bréguet Br.965 Épaulard anti-submarine warfare aircraft.

Design

The Alizé was a low-wing monoplane of conventional configuration powered by a single Rolls-Royce Dart turboprop engine. It had a CSF radar system with a retractable antenna dome in its belly. The cockpit accommodated a crew of three, including pilot, radar operator, and sensor operator. The pilot was seated in front on the left, the navigator in front on the right, and the sensor operator sat sideways behind them. The landing gear was of tricycle configuration, with the main gear retracting backwards into nacelles in the wings. The main gear had dual wheels, and the front part of the nacelles accommodated sonobuoys. The Alizé had a yoke-style arresting hook.

The internal weapons bay could accommodate a homing torpedo or depth charges, and underwing stores pylons could carry bombs, depth charges, rockets, or missiles. Typical underwing stores included 68 mm (2.68 in) rocket pods or AS.12 wire-guided antiship missiles.

Operational history

The prototype Alizé first flew on 6 October 1956. It was exhibited at the Paris Air Show at Paris Le Bourget Airport in May 1957.

A total of 89 examples of the Alizé were built between 1957 and 1962, including two preproduction prototypes. 75 production aircraft were acquired by the Aéronavale, with initial service delivery in March 1959. The Alizé went into operation on the carriers Arromanches, Clémenceau and Foch, and were also used in shore-based training. 12 were acquired by the Indian Navy. Some sources say that there were five preproduction prototypes, which may mean some of the prototypes were brought up to production standard and passed on to the Aéronavale; and that India acquired 17 examples, which hints that they bought five used aircraft from the Aéronavale.

The Indian Navy operated the Alizé from shore bases and from the light carrier . The Alizé was used for reconnaissance and patrol during India's 1961 liberation of Portuguese controlled Goa, and was also used for ASW patrol during the Indo-Pakistani War of 1971, during which one Alizé was shot down by a Pakistan Air Force F-104 Starfighter. It also sank three gunboats. The Alizé dwindled in numbers in the Indian Navy during the 1980s, was relegated to shore-based patrol in 1987.  Nevertheless, they were employed that year in support of the Indian Peacekeeping Force's Operation Pawan in Sri Lanka, flying sorties against the LTTE and crippling the merchant ship Progress Light. The type was finally phased out in 1991, replaced in its duties by ASW helicopters.

The Aéronavale provided the Alizé with a series of upgrades. A modernization program performed in the early 1980s refitted 28 of the aircraft to the Br.1050M standard, featuring improved Thomson-CSF Iguane radar as used on the Atlantique NG ocean-patrol aircraft, new OMEGA radio navigation gear, and a new ARAR 12 radar and radio location ("electronic support measures / ESM") system.

Another upgrade program in the early 1990s fitted 24 of these aircraft with a new decoy system; a microcomputer-based data processing system; a datalink system; and other new avionics. Later in the decade, they were also fitted with the Thomson-CSF TTD Optronique Chlio forward-looking infrared (FLIR) imaging sensor. Despite the upgrades, by this time the Alizé was clearly not capable of hunting modern nuclear submarines, and so it was relegated to ocean surface patrol.

As late as 1997, the Aéronavale was still operating 24 examples for surface patrol. The Alizé was used operationally during the NATO air campaign against Yugoslavia over Kosovo in early 1999, with the aircraft flying off the carrier Foch. The last Alizé was withdrawn from service in 2000 with the retirement of the Foch.

Operators

 French Navy
 French Naval Aviation (Aviation Navale)

 Indian Navy

Specifications (Bréguet Alizé)

See also

References

Bibliography

Michell, Simon. (editor). Jane's Civil and Military Aircraft Upgrades 1994-95. Coulsdon, UK:Jane's Information Group, 1994. .

External links

Unofficial French Navy site on the Alizé

 1050
1950s French anti-submarine aircraft
Single-engined tractor aircraft
Low-wing aircraft
Single-engined turboprop aircraft
Carrier-based aircraft
Aircraft first flown in 1956